Gerdian, Gerdeyan or Gardian may refer to:
 Gerdian, Hamadan
 Gardian, West Azerbaijan